The fulvous-headed tanager (Thlypopsis fulviceps) is a species of bird in the family Thraupidae.
It is found in the Venezuelan Coastal Range and far northern Colombia.
Its natural habitats are subtropical or tropical moist montane forests and heavily degraded former forest.

References

fulvous-headed tanager
Birds of the Venezuelan Coastal Range
fulvous-headed tanager
Taxonomy articles created by Polbot